Ayyuqi was a 10th-century Persian poet. A contemporary of Mahmud of Ghazni, he wrote the epic Varqa wa Golshāh in 2,250 verses, story of the love between a youth named Varqa and a maiden, Golshah. According to the poet himself, the story is based on the Arabic work ‘Orwa wa ‘Afra. The work survives in a unique manuscript at Istanbul (in picture). He also wrote some qasidas. No reliable information about Ayyuqi has come down. His works are characterized by paired rhyme interspersed with ghazal.

See also

List of Persian poets and authors
Persian literature

References

 Jan Rypka, History of Iranian Literature. Reidel Publishing Company. 1968 . 
 See the work of professor A. Ateş

Persian-language poets
10th-century Persian-language poets
Ghaznavid-period poets